The large parish church of St Giles, which is in the village of St Giles in the Wood, Devon, England, came into being in 1309. When it was restored in 1862–3, many monuments were retained, including the monument and effigy of Thomas Chafe (d. 1648) of Dodscott, three monumental brasses, of Alenora Pollard (d. 1430), Margaret Rolle of Stevenstone (d. 1592) and a small brass of her husband John Rolle (d.1570). There are also 19th- and 20th-century monuments to the Rolle family.

History
The church came into being in 1309 when licence was obtained from the Bishop of Exeter to build a chapel of ease because the church at Great Torrington was considered too far for the convenience of the local inhabitants. The licence was obtained by Sir Richard Merton, who held the advowson of Great Torrington. The church was dedicated to St Giles the Hermit, and its benefactors included Sir William Herward of Dodscott, and a member of the Pollard family of Way, Barry of Winscott, de Stevenstone of Stevenstone, and Dynant of Whitesley.

It was completely rebuilt in the 16th century, in the Perpendicular-Gothic style. Of this building, only the outer walls and the west tower, which contains six bells, survived its restoration of 1862–3 by John Hayward, funded by Mark Rolle. Rolle also donated the marble and alabaster pulpit. A memorial cross erected by the parishioners in his memory stands in the churchyard to the east of the church directly in front of the lychgate. In 1879 an organ chamber and vestry were added. The local historian W. G. Hoskings did not care for Rolle's restoration of the church and wrote in 1954 that he "spared no expense to make it as ugly as his own house", referring to Stevenstone of which Hoskings had already written: "The richest man in Devon built himself the ugliest house."

In 1967, a chapel named after Mary Withecombe was created out of part of the south aisle, in which smaller congregations now meet.

Monuments

Thomas Chafe

A monument with lively recumbent effigy of Thomas Chafe (1585-1648) of Dodscott is in the south aisle of the church. Above in the centre is the heraldic achievement of Chafe, to the dexter are the arms of Thomas Chafe impaling the arms of Burgoyne, his wife's family: Azure, a talbot passant argent; on the sinister side are the arms of his brother-in-law Tristram Risdon: Argent, three birdbolts sable, impaling the arms of his wife Pascoe Chafe, the "Aunt Risedon" whom Chafe instructed his nephew in his will should be included within the monument.

Chafe's sister Pascoe Chafe was the wife of his neighbour Tristram Risdon (d. 635) of Winscott. He married Margaret Burgoyne (d. 655), which family Lysons (1822) states to have been from  South Tawton: "A younger branch of the Bedfordshire family of that name, continued (in Devon) for several generations, having married the heiresses of Sheldon, Stoning, and Courtenay. The heiress of the Burgoynes married Jackson, of Exeter. William Courtenay Burgoyne, Esq., died in 1750. Arms: Azure, a talbot passant argent on a mullet or a crescent sable for difference".

A monument to Robert Burgoyne dated 1651 exists in the church at South Tawton and shows the arms of a talbot dog. Their 16th-century manor house at nearby South Zeal is now the "Oxenham Arms" public house. The monument was directed to be erected by his executor and nephew Thomas Chafe (1611-1662), MP for Totnes in 1660, in the will of the deceased, dated 24 September 1648, for which the sum of £30 was allocated by him. He directed especially that his nephew should "inscript in my monument some memory of his good Aunt Risedon", which was apparently effected by showing the Risdon arms on the monument.

During the rebuilding of the church in 1862 by Mark Rolle, the monument was moved from its original position of great honour in the chancel within the altar rails, and was replaced against the south wall of the tower. Two female figures forming part of the composition were accidentally destroyed during the move, having crumbled upon being dislodged. It was reported by Hoskins in 1954 to be "now pushed into the tower and dirty and neglected". In 1987 it was restored, repainted and repositioned in the south aisle in the newly created chapel enclosure financed by a bequest from the parishioner Mary Withecombe. The Latin text of the monument is as follows:
"In piam Thomae Chafe generosi memoriam ex perantique Chaforum de Chafe-Combe familia in comitatu Somerset oriundi ex collegio Exon(iensis) in academia Oxon(iensis) artium magistri; viri probitate virtute ac ingenio insigis qui in apostolica fide constante versatus in beatae justorum resurrectionis spe animam expiravit XXVto die Novemb(ris) anno salutis 1648 aetatisq(ue) suae climacterico magno. eXVVlas sVas eXVlt MeDICVs. Uxorem relquit Margeriam filiam Philippi Burgoyn e clarissima Burgoynorum prosapia orti matronam religiosissimam bonorumq(ue) operum plenissimam quae et obdormivit in Domino die .. anno a Chr(ist)o nato 16.. aetatis vero suae ..
Abstulit a nobis misere quem flem ademptum, 
Abstulit e vivis mortis iniqua manus, 
Nec cecidit solus namq(ue) et providentia virtus, 
Candor, amor, pietas, interiere simul,
Teste vel invidia vita est lethoq(ue) beatus, 
Vivus erat Domini mortuus in Domino". 

Which may be translated thus:"In pious memory of the noble Thomas Chafe arisen from the very ancient family of the Chafes from Chaffcombe in the county of Somerset, Master of Arts from Exeter College in the University of Oxford; a man remarkable in probity, virtue and character who having been devoted in constant apostolic faith breathed out his spirit on the 25th day of November in the year of grace 1648 and in his grand climacteric year, in hope of the blessed resurrection of the Just. "The doctor rejoiced exceedingly at his loud howlings".  He left a wife Margery, daughter of Philip Burgoyn sprung from the most famous stock of the Burgoyns, a most religious matron and most full of good works who too went to sleep in Christ on the (left blank) day of (left blank) in the year since the birth of Christ 16..(left blank) of her age (left blank)"
He took away from us misery.....,
He took away from the living the unjust hand of death,
Neither did he fall alone, for prudence, virtue
Honesty, love and piety perished at the same time,
With envy as witness ....(?)
Of the Lord he was alive, he died in the Lord".

The apparently enigmatic phrase Exuulas suas exult medicus contains the cryptic chronogram XVVIVXVIMDICV, shown in capital letters, which when added together as separate numbers (and treating L as I) equals 1648, the year of his death. Such devices are also present in the near contemporary Dennis monument at Buckland Brewer and the Fortescue monument at Weare Giffard. His wife Margery died in 1655 and was buried on 30 March 1655 as is recorded in the parish register, yet no one remembered to inscribe her date of death and age on her husband's monument in the blank spaces left for that purpose.

The heraldic achievement above the effigy shows arms: Azure, five fusils fesswise argent a canton of the last; crest: A demi-lion rampant bezantee azure armed and langued gules holding between its paws a fusil argent.

Alyanora Pollard

The monumental brass of Alyanora Pollard consists of the original lower half of a female figure, the top half being an accurate modern replacement, with the inscription below it:
Hic jacet Alyanora Pollard qui fuit uxor Joh(ann)is Pollard et filia Joh(ann)is Copleston qui obiit xxi die mensis Septembris Anno d(o)m(in)i Mill(ensi)mo CCCCXXX cuius animae propitietur Deus Amen.(Here lies Eleanor / Alianore Pollard who was the wife of John Pollard and daughter of John Copleston who died on the 21st day of the month of September in the One thousandth four hundredth and thirtieth year of Our Lord of whose soul may God look upon with favour Amen.)
John de Coplestone was of Colebroke, Devon and married Katherine de Graas, by whom he had Eleanor. There are two further inscriptions on the same slab made later to commemorate two distant relations:
Firstly, immediately beneath the above inscription, a small brass plaque with portrait of a kneeling lady, to commemorate Johanna Risdon (d. 17/5/1610), daughter of George Pollard of Langley in the parish of Yarnscombe and mother of Tristram Risdon.
Secondly, below the last, incised in the stone slab on which the brasses are affixed memorial text to Margaret Risdon (d.1636), daughter of Tristram Risdon.

Risdon mural monument
A mural monument on the west wall of the north transept is inscribed with the following much faded text:
M(emoriae) S(acrum) of Mary the wife of William Risdon of this parish , gent., who departed this life ..d of September An(n)o Dom(ini) 16(90?) aetatis suae 66.o  as allso of Mary ye daughter of Joseph Prust, gent., by Mary his wife who dyed the 6th of August in the same year An(n)o aetatis suae 4.o. Posuit Gulielmus Risdon amantissimus unius maritus lugens alterius avus
Translated as follows: "William Risdon placed (this), the most loving husband of the one, the mourning grandfather of the other". William was the second son of Tristram Risdon and the heir of his elder brother Giles Risdon (1609-1644).

The heraldic achievement atop the Risdon mural monument shows the arms as: Argent, three bird-bolts sable (Risdon) impaling Party per pale azure and purpure, a cross flory or between four lambs argent each gorged with a rope pendant azure (arms of Mary Isack, daughter of Francis Isack (1589-1658) of Barnstaple and Aylescott, West Down, Devon, (whose mural monument with effigy survives in St Calixtus Church, West Down) by his wife Grace Roberts, and wife of William Risdon). The crest of Risdon above is: An elephant's head erased ermine eared and armed or.

Rolle family
There are also 19th- and 20th-century monuments to the Rolle family, including a mural monument and stained glass window in the south aisle to John Rolle, 1st Baron Rolle (d. 1842), a mural monument in the south aisle, in mosaic depicting the Good Shepherd, of Mark Rolle (d. 1907), and two 16th-century monumental brasses combined on the floor of the south aisle, of Margaret Rolle and her husband John Rolle (d. 1570), the eldest son and heir of George Rolle (d. 1552), MP, the founder of the family in Devon who purchased Stevenstone and built the first of the Rolle residences on the site.

Notes

References

Grade II listed churches in Devon